Eulepidotis preclara is a moth of the family Erebidae. It is found in the Neotropical realm, including Peru.

It was described by Edward L. Todd in 1962.

References

Moths described in 1962
preclara